The Punch was an Australian opinion and news website founded in 2009. It was owned and run by News Limited, the Australian holding of News Corporation. The website described itself as being "for every Australian with a passion for debate" and "Australia's best conversation".

Tory Maguire was the website's Editor. Its writers include Tory Shepherd, Anthony Sharwood, Lucy Kippist, and Daniel Piotrowski, as well as the site's Editor-in-Chief, David Penberthy. Some Punch articles were syndicated and republished nationwide in other News Limited tabloids such as The Daily Telegraph.

The site was shut down on March 15, 2013, with future content and Punch staff merged into the News Limited Network and news.com.au newsrooms.

References

Australian political websites
News Corp Australia
2009 establishments in Australia
2013 disestablishments in Australia
Internet properties established in 2009
Internet properties disestablished in 2013
Defunct Australian websites